Penes is a plural form of penis.

Penes may also refer to:
Mihaela Peneș (born 1947), Romanian athlete
Penes (Ancient Greece), the "active poor"

See also
Harry H. Pennes (1918–1963), American physician
Pens (disambiguation)
Penis (disambiguation)